The 1000 Kilometres of Paris was an endurance race, mainly for sports cars, which was held at the Autodrome de Linas-Montlhéry in France from 1956 to 1995.

1956
The event is called Grand Prix of the Automobile Club of Île-de-France. Following the accident of the 24 Hours of Le Mans 1955  and the measures taken by the public authorities, the safety conditions of the Linas-Montlhéry autodrome were improved; in particular 34 stands, with access to refueling, were built. A Maserati 300S win at the average speed of 150.239 km/h. A Gordini T15S finished in eighth place, a  DB Panhard at the thirteenth, a Ferry powered by Renault at the fourteenth and a Vernet-Pairard — also powered by Renault — at the sixteenth. The three  Panhard Monopoles did not finish.

1962
The race became part of the World Sportscar Championship. René Bonnet and Charles Deutsch each line up a 1000 cm3 prototype powered by Renault and Panhard. The domination of the Ferrari 250 GTO was unchallenged in the first six places: Pedro and Ricardo Rodriguez win another victory at 157,727 km/h average.

1995
The race was interrupted after 540 km. The four Ferrari F40s entered in the Group GT1 were broken, as was the McLaren F1 GTR; only a Venturi 600 LM had saved the GT1's honor by finishing in fourth place.

Winners 

Note: The 1972 race was held at Rouen-Les-Essarts.

Endurance racing in Paris before 1956 

Prior to 1956 other races were held at Montlhéry for touring cars. These included:

Grand Prix Tourisme of the AC.F.
24 Hours of Paris
1927 — George Duller and Frank Clement led from start to finish in a Bentley 4½ Litre.
1955 — Auguste Veuillet and Gonzague Olivier, in a 1.1 L Porsche 550 Spyder.
8 Hours of Montlhéry
1934 — Charles Balester won this unique edition.
12 Hours of Paris
1938 — René Le Bègue and André Morel, in a Talbot Lago T26 for the first Olazur Cup.
1939 — Ten days before the scheduled race date Germany invades Poland, starting the Second World War. Race is cancelled.
1947 — Guy Mairesse, in a Delahaye 135.
1948 — Luigi Chinetti, in a Ferrari 166 Spyder Corsa.
1950 — Luigi Chinetti and Jean Lucas, in a Ferrari 166 MM.
'Grand Prix of the AC.F. (French Grand Prix)
1931 French Grand Prix – The Grand Prix was held as a 10 hour endurance race for Grand Prix cars, won by Louis Chiron and Achille Varzi driving a Bugatti.
1936 French Grand Prix – The Grand Prix was held as a 1000km race for Sports Cars. Won by Jean-Pierre Wimille and Raymond Sommer driving a Bugatti.
1937 French Grand Prix – The Grand Prix was held as a 500km race for Sports Cars. Won by Louis Chiron driving a Talbot.

References

Further reading
William Boddy, Montlhéry, the story of the Paris autodrome''

External links
Livre : les 1000 kilomètres de Paris 1956-1994  (Edition Palmier)
1000 km de Paris 1960 (Panhard Racing Team)
Montlhéry - 1000 km 1971 (Classic Courses)

Sports car races
Endurance motor racing
Recurring sporting events established in 1956
Auto races in France